Atwi is a Lebanese surname. Notable people with the surname include:

 Abbas Ahmed Atwi (born 1979), Lebanese footballer
 Abbas Ali Atwi (born 1984), Lebanese footballer
 Mohamed Atwi (1987–2020), Lebanese footballer

Arabic-language surnames